I, Too, Have Seen the Woods is the sixth studio album released by the American musical group Kid Creole and the Coconuts. It was released in 1987 and includes the single "Dancing at the Bain Douches".

Reception

I, Too, Have Seen the Woods received mixed reviews from critics. In a negative review, AllMusic's Vince Ripol described the group as artistically stranded. He wrote that the band was still capable of brilliant moments, but that the album lacked the focused direction of prior efforts like Fresh Fruit in Foreign Places and the group's tour de force, Wise Guy. He describes Darnell as too clever for his own good, but does single out "Dancin' at the Bains Douches" for setting a standard that the surrounding material fails to meet, although "Agony...Ecstasy" and "Call It a Day" are close runners-up.

In a positive review, Robert Christgau, in The Village Voice, praises Darnell for his consistency and calls the album a typically elegant and literate dance album in which mortality impinges attractively.

Track listing

Personnel

The Kid
King Creole – lead vocals, guitar, bass, percussion

The Coconuts
Adriana Kaegi – background vocals, sweet inspiration
Bongo Eddie – percussion
Carol Colman – bass
Cheryl Poirier – background vocals
Coati Mundi – lead vocals, vibes, social work and psychiatric counseling for all band members
Coffee Keeps – background vocals
Dave Span – drums
Eugene Grey – guitar
Haitia Fuller – introducing, female lead vocals
Janique Swedberg – background vocals
Jimmy Rippetoe – guitar
Peter Schott – synthetic and real keyboards, bass synth

Pond Life orchestra
Charlie Lagond – saxophones, clarinets, flutes
Ken Fradley – trumpets, flugel horns
Lee Robertson (The Professor) – trombones, french horns

The Dayenites
Cory Daye, Gichy Dan, Lourdes Cotto – background vocals

Special performances rendered
Andy González, Djonebe Muflet, Herman Olivera, Jay Stovall, Lourdes Cotto, Peter Brown, Ronnie Rogers

Technical credits
August Darnell – producer
Ronnie Rogers – producer (7)
Coati Mundi – producer (5, 10)
Carol Colman – production co-ordination
Dave Wittman, Michel Sauvage, Steven Stanley – mixing
Clive Smith – programming (Fairlight Sessions)
Michel Sauvage – engineering (1-4, 6 to 9, 11)
Julian McBrowne – engineering (5, 10)
Judy Kirschner – assistant engineer
Bob Ludwig – mastering
Janet Perr – art director
Albert Sanchez – photographer
Adriana Kaegi – cover design
Andreas Bernhardt – hair and make-up

References

1987 albums
Kid Creole and the Coconuts albums
Sire Records albums